The Polish Embassy in Beijing is the diplomatic mission of the Republic of Poland to the People's Republic of China. The chancery is located at 1, Ritan Rd, Beijing.

The chancery of the Polish Embassy in Beijing is located, as with many other embassies, in the special diplomatic quarter of the city. Situated behind a large and ornate screen fence, the embassy is guarded night and day by officers of the People's Armed Police. The building was originally designed in a socialist realist style, but upon construction was actually built in a largely modernist style with a few elements of classicism, notably the columns supporting the portico. This was to make the embassy more distinguishable as the permanent seat of an important European nation and not present a less 'prestigious' facade to the average passerby.

Since January 2018 the ambassador of the Polish Republic to the People's Republic of China is Wojciech Zajączkowski.

See also 
China–Poland relations
List of diplomatic missions of Poland
Foreign relations of Poland
Polish nationality law

References

External links
Embassy of Poland in Beijing 

Poland
Beijing
China–Poland relations